Sir John Tyrwhitt, 5th Baronet (c. 1663–1741), of Stainfield, Lincolnshire, was a British landowner and politician who sat in the House of Commons between 1715 and 1734.

Tyrwhitt was the only surviving son of Sir Philip Tyrwhitt, 4th Baronet MP of Stainfield, Lincolnshire and his wife Penelope de la Fountain, daughter of Sir Erasmus de la Fountain of Kirkby Beilars, Leicestershire. His father died in July 1688, when he succeeded to the estates and baronetcy.  
He married his first wife  Elizabeth Phillips, daughter of Francis Phillips of Kempton Park, Sunbury, Middlesex on 24 February 1691. 

For the year 1693 to 1694 he was High Sheriff of Lincolnshire. 

He made a second marriage, by licence of 5 August 1704, to Mary Drake daughter of Sir William Drake of Shardeloes, Buckinghamshire.

Tyrwhitt was returned unopposed as Whig Member of Parliament for Lincoln  on his family's interest at the 1715 general election. He supported the Administration in 1716  on the septennial bill, but in 1719 opposed the repeal of the Occasional Conformity and Schism Acts. At the 1722 general election he was elected MP for Lincoln in a contest but was defeated in 1727. However, he regained his seat at a by-election on 5 June 1728. He did not stand at the 1734 general election.
 
Tyrwhitt died in November 1741. He had two daughter by his first wife, and a son and four daughters by his second wife. He was succeeded in the baronetcy by his son John.

References

1660s births
1741 deaths
High Sheriffs of Lincolnshire
British MPs 1715–1722
British MPs 1722–1727
British MPs 1727–1734
Members of the Parliament of Great Britain for English constituencies
Baronets in the Baronetage of England